Lumby may refer to:

Placenames
 Lumby, British Columbia, a community in the Canadian province of British Columbia
Lumby Junction, British Columbia, a railroad junction
 Lumby, Denmark, a village near Odense Airport on Funen, Denmark
 Lumby, North Yorkshire, a village in England

People
Lumby (surname)